The Am-Pol Eagle Citizen of the Year Award is given out by the weekly Polish American newspaper the Am-Pol Eagle. The award is given to individuals and organizations in the Polish American community "in recognition of outstanding service and unselfish contributions on the behalf of the Polish-American cause" in various fields. There are 25 different categories but each category may not have a winner every year. The award is considered to be one of the highest honors given within the Polish-American community. The Am-Pol Eagle, published in Buffalo, New York, was founded in 1960 by Matthew Pelczynski who was known as "the voice of the Polish-American community."

Am-Pol Eagle Citizen of the Year Award recipients

National
2013 – None
2012 – None
2011 – None
2008 – Anthony Bajdek
2007 – Christian Holocaust Survivors
2006 – Deborah M. Majka
2005 – Bozenna Urbanowicz Gilbride
2004 – Edward Rowny
2003 – Kaya Ploss
2002 – None
2001 – Susanne Lotarski
2000 – Les Kuszynski
1999 – Edward Pinkowski
1998 – James Pawelczyk
1997 – Michael Preisler
1996 – Stanley Milewski
1995 – Myra Lenard
1994 – Adam Maida
1993 – David Bonior
1992 – Edward G. Dykla
1981 – Aloysius Mazewski
1980 – Michael Kogutek
1979 – Carl Yastrzemski
1978 – John G. Fray
1977 – Alfred Abramowicz D.D
1976 – Zbigniew Brzezinski
1975 – Mitchell Kobelinski
1974 – Bobby Vinton
1973 – Barbara Mikulski
1972 – Eugene Kusielewicz

Art/Drama
2013 – Anna Gabryszak
2012 – Roman Kujawa
2011 – Tod Kniazuk
2009 – Rev. Walter Madej
2008 – Chopin Singing Society of Buffalo's production of Flis
2007 – None
2006 – Ron Urbanczyk
2005 – Brittany Mruczek
2004 – Kazimierz Braun
2003 – None
2002 – Gary Witkowski
2001 – Mark David Skura
2000 – Ted Pietrzak
1999 – Thoman Kazmierczak III
1998 – Thadeusz Pyzikiewicz
1997 – Fred Szatkowski
1996 – Kate Koperski
1995 – Tom Dudzick
1994 – Melva Wrobel
1993 – Thea Zastempowski
1992 – Christine Nowak
1981 – Louis F. Dlugosz
1980 – Laura Dory
1979 – George Lukasiewicz
1978 – Benedict T. Rozek
1977 – Alice Wadowski-Bak
1976 – Thomas Banasiak
1975 – Ann Nowak
1974 – Walter Prochownik
1973 – None
1972 – Daniel Reczek

Business
2013 – Michael Kucinski
2012 – Buszka Funeral Home
2011 – Kaminski & Sons Truck Equipment Inc.
2010 – The Rutowski Family Pharmacies
2009 – Danny Potts
2008 – Mazurek's Bakery
2007 – John Mills
1981 – F. Ronald Malecki
1980 – Chet Musialowski
1979 – Daniel J. Majeski
1978 – Stanley Hajeski
1977 – Mathew Witkowski
1976 – Alfred Fabiniak
1975 – Andrew Ciolek
1974 – Florian Burczynski
1973 – Joseph Dziminski Jr.
1972 – Robert Kowalewski

Civic Leader
2013 – None
2012 – Bob Kresse
2011 – None
2009 – The Felician Sisters
2008 – None
2007 – Dr. Norman Weinberg
2005 – James Ostrowski
2004 – Bishop Edward M. Grosz
2003 – Msgr. Matthew Kopacz
2001 – John Dobrzenski
1994 – Pauline Nowak / William Trezevant
1993 – James Konicki
1981 – Rev. Joseph Bialek
1980 - None
1979 - None
1978 - None
1977 - None
1976 - None
1975 – Bishop Daniel Cyganowski
1974 – Robert Biniszkiewicz
1973 – Edward Posluszny
1972 – Dennis Kazmierczak

Community Leader (Non Pole)
2013 – Dr. Andrew Wise
2012 – Jean Dickson
2011 – Mary Lanham
2009 – Amy Betros
2008 – Mary Holland
2007 – Dr. Muriel Howard
1981 – Most Rev. Edward D. Head
1980 – None
1979 – Buffalo Philharmonic Orchestra
1978 – Richard Kellman
1977 – Douglas L. Turner
1976 – Hon. Jack Kemp
1975 – Edward V. Regan
1974 – Dr. E. K. Fretwell

Community Organization
2013 – Broadway Market 125th Anniversary Committee
2012 – Permanent Chair of Polish Culture Canisius College
2011 – Polish Heritage Society of Rochester
2010 – Pulaski Police Association
2009 – Polish Singers Alliance District IX
2008 – Harmony Polish Folk Ensemble
2006 – Cheektowaga Polish American Festival Committee
2002 – University at Buffalo Polish Student Association
1981 – Polish American Congress, Western New York Division
1980 – Niagara Frontier Post 1041
1979 – Walden District Taxpayers Association

Culture
2013 – Kathleen Rumfola
2012 – Dr. Peter Gessner
2011 – Robert Johnson
2010 – Sophie Hodorowicz-Knab
2009 – Rev. Louis Dolinic
2008 – Andrew Golebiowski
2007 – Wanda Slawinski
1981 – Adeline Wujeikewski
1980 – Hon.Frank Swiatek
1979 – Helena Golebiowski
1978 – Alice Posluszny
1977 – Maria Laskowska
1976 – Thaddeus Nyczko
1975 – Marian Strzelczyk
1974 – Sister Ellen Marie
1973 – Emilie Lubelski
1972 – Leonard Glowinski

Education
2013 –  Ashli Skura Dreher
2012 –  Fr. Michael Sajda
2011 – Pomost International
2009 – Msgr. Adamski Polish Saturday School
2008 – Fr.Charles Jagodzinski
2007 – Patricia Weinreich
2006 – Danuta Nycz
1981 – Edward Szmraj
1980 – Father Leon Krop
1979 – Raymond Dziedzic
1978 – Dr. Joseph Gizinski
1977 – Anne Szczesny
1976 – Sister Mary Pachomia
1975 – Leonard Sikora
1974 – Frank Benbenek
1973 – Thomas Michalski
1972 – Mary Amalia

Fraternal
2013 – Pulaski Police Assn.
2012 – None
2011 – None
2010 – Dunkirk Dom Polski
2006 – Polish Union of America
1981 – Lucy Rubach
1980 – Joseph Lipa
1979 – Thaddeus J. Zolkiewicz
1978 – Victor A. Drajem, Jr.
1977 – Bronislaw Durewicz
1976 – Clara Owczarczak
1975 – Lawrence Wujcukowski
1974 – Joseph Starosciak
1973 – Clara Weber
1972 – Irene Cwiklinski

Good Neighbor
2013 – None
2012 – None
2011 – None
2010 – Canadian Polish Congress - Niagara District
2007 – Chester & Diane Stranczek
2006 – OLC Pierogi Makers
2001 – Daniel Mocniak

Government
2013 – Gerald Chwalinski
2012 – None
2011 – Robert Giza
2010 – Steven J. Stepniak
2008 – Catherine Rybczynski
2007 – Richard Kloc
1981 – Daved Rutecki
1980 – Thomas Owczarczak
1979 – Edwin A. Gorski
1978 – Thaddeus J. Szymanski
1977 – William M. Skretny
1976 – Hon. Henry Nowak
1975 – Joseph Bala
1974 – Stanley Makowski
1973 – Stan Bolas
1972 – Daniel Kwiatkowski

Health/Medicine
2013 – Jean Wactawski-Wende
2012 – Dr. Edwin Grzankowski
2011 – None
2008 – Dr.Kevin Cichocki
2007 – Dr. William F. Wieczorek, Ph.D.
1981 – Dr. Daniel Kozers
1980 – Dr. Robert Zwirecki
1979 – Anthony Prezyna, M.D.
1978 – Dr. Joseph Matala
1977 – None
1976 – Dr. Richard Powell
1975 – Dr. Lucian Rutecki
1974 – Dr. Eugene Ruszaj
1973 – None
1972 – Dr. Joseph Kij

Heritage
2013 – Amy Smardz
2012 – Edward Prabucki
2011 – Henry Chimes
2010 – Dr. Margaret Stefanski
2009 – Barbara Frackiewicz
2008 – Polish Heritage Dancers of Western New York
2007 – Gregory Witul
2006 – Donna Zellner Neal
2005 – Bishop Thaddeus Peplowski
2004 – Martin Biniasz
2003 – Robert Fronckowiak
2002 – Lucyna Dziedzic
2001 – Edward Kornowski
2000 – David Newman
1999 – Polish Social Volunteers
1998 – Honorable Carl Bucki
1997 – Andrew Golebiowski
1996 – Walter Grabowski
1995 – Diane Cieczka – Jircitano
1994 – Benjamin Fiore
1992 – Edmund Kiedrowski & Alice Kiedrowski
1987 – Victoria Jarnot
1981 – Genevieve Pietka
1980 – Matthew Kubik
1979 – Theodore Mikoll
1978 – Stanly Dawidziak
1977 – William Borodacz
1976 – Zdaislaw Ordon
1975 – Bronislaus Trzyszewski

Humanitarian
2013 – None
2012 – Lisa Florczak
2011 – None
2010 – Tom Zablotny
2007 – Christine Jozwiak
1981 – Judy Kasinski
1980 – Caroline Szymanski
1979 – Verna C. Neubauer
1978 – Irene Szczesnika
1977 – Dorothy Orlowski
1976 – Sister Mary Desponsata
1975 – Rev. Edward Ulaszewski
1974 – Richard Glowacki
1973 – Sophia Dabrowski
1972 – Apolonia Szpakowska

Human Rights
1980 – Lech Walesa

Individual in Organizations
2013 – Charles Peszynski
2012 – Stephen Flor & Andrew Pilecki
2011 – Bernadine Szymanski
2010 – Frances Cirbus
2009 – Edward Reska
2008 – Florence Oleszek
2007 – Irene Pawlowski
1981 – Walter Chrzanowski
1980 – Frank Niemiec
1979 – Richard B. Solecki
1978 – Edward Sieracki
1977 – Michael J. Kogutek
1976 – Karol Tomaszewski
1975 – John Fliss
1974 – Art Kilichowski
1973 – Leo A. Trembowicz
1972 – Jack R. Poczciwinski

Labor
2013 – None
2012 – Stan Nowak
2011 – None
2006 – Paul R. Dobrzenski
1981 – Joseph Benbenek
1980 – Edward Ziarnowski
1979 – Jerome C. Gorski
1978 – Hon.Richard Slisz
1977 – Casimir Walas
1976 – Peter Rybka
1975 – Frank Malinkiewicz
1974 – Matt Ginal
1973 – Louis Dudek
1972 – Floyd Lisinski

Law
2013 – Robert Ciesielski
2012 – Hon. Leslie Foschio
2011 – Charles Tomaszewski
2010 – Hon. Henry J. Nowak, Jr.
2009 – Hon. William Skretny
2008 – Hon.Michael Pietruszka
2007 – William Hochul
1981 – Eugene Buczkowski
1980 – Norman Walawender
1979 – Hon. Joseph S. Forma
1978 – Hon. Edward V. Mazur
1977 – Hon. Julian F. Kubiniec
1976 – Hon. Victor Manz
1975 – Hon. William Ostrowski
1974 – Leonard Walentynowicz
1973 – Hon. Theodore Kasler
1972 – Hon. Alois C. Mazur

Media
2013 – Christopher Parker
2012 – Charity Vogel
2011 – Rick Franusiak
2010 – Mark Wozniak
2009 – Steve Cichon
2008 – Christopher Byrd
2007 – Ron Dombrowski
1996 – Alice Wadowski-Bak
1981 – Don Polec
1980 – Matthew Gryta
1979 – Robert S. Bukaty
1978 – Eugene M. Krzyzynski
1977 – John Krieger
1976 – Wanda Kogut
1975 – Daniel Lesniak
1974 – Matt Kopanty
1973 – Sister Mary Donata

Military/Veteran
2013 – None
2012 – Brett Gornewicz
2011 – None
2009 – Stanley Blake
2008 – Alfreda Miecyjak, Krystyna Pienkowska, & Jozefa Solecki
2007 – Stanley & Antonina Markut

Music
2013 – Michelle Cofield
2012 – Michael Zachowicz
2011 – CitySide
2010 – Emily Tworek-Helenbrook
2009 – Jacek Muzyk
2008 – Jerry Darlak and the Touch
2007 – Bell Choir of Holy Mother of the Rosary Cathedral
2006 – Goo Goo Dolls
2005 – Art Kubera
2004 – St. Michael the Archangel Choir
2003 – Sunshine Records
2002 – St. Casimir Choir
2001 – Buffalo Concertina All-Stars
2000 – Buffalo Polka Boosters
1999 – Steve Krzeminski
1998 – Valerian Ruminski
1997 – Donald Jenczka
1996 – Radosc-Joy Choir
1995 – Villa Maria Chorale
1994 – David Seweryniak
1993 – Mark Kohan
1992 – Linda Orszulka
1986 – Edward Witul
1981 – Walter Szwajda
1980 – Louis Distel
1979 – Sr. Mary Virginis Kozlowska
1978 – Art Kubera
1977 – Czarnik Quartet
1976 – Genia Lars
1975 – Michael Tworek
1974 – Joseph Macielag
1973 – Sister M. Martinelle
1972 – Janina Staniewicz

Politics
2013 – Steven Walters
2012 – Hon. Dennis Gabryszak
2011 – None
2010 – Kevin Smardz
2009 – Supervisor Mary Holtz
2006 – Marck C. Poloncarz
2005 – Deborah Bucki
2004 – Stasia Vogel
2003 – Senator George Maziarz
2002 – Joseph Augustine
2001 – Norman Polanski
2000 – Raymond K. Dusza
1999 – Joseph Golombek
1998 – Mayor Robert Kesicki
1997 – Mayor Robert Kucewicz
1996 – Greg Olma
1995 – Janice Kowalski – Kelly
1994 – James Jankowiak
1993 – Sen. William Stachowski
1992 – Leonard Gramza
1981 – Sen. William Stachowski
1980 – Hon. William Rogowski
1979 – Hon. Edward J. Rutkowski
1978 – Stanley Stachowski
1977 – Hon. Richard Okoniewski
1976 – Hon. Shirley Storarski
1975 – Genevieve Starosciak
1974 – Dennis Gorski
1973 – Stan Franczyk
1972 – Legislator Stanley Zagora

Religion
2013 – Rev. Richard Jedrzejewski 
2012 – Rev. Mike Burzynski 
2011 – Parishioners of St. Adalbert's Basilica
2010 – Sr. Judith M. Kubicki, CSSF
2009 – Rev. Walter Szczesny
2008 – Fr.Anzelm Chalupka
2007 – Daniel Geary, OFM, Conv.
1981 – Rev. Sister Alberta Surowiec
1980 – Rev. Max Panczakiewicz
1979 – Rev. Robert K. Golombek
1978 – Rev. Lucian Krolikowski
1977 – Rev. Msgr. D. J. Szostak
1976 – Rev. Msgr. Chester Meloch
1975 – Mother Mary Benice
1974 – Rev. Anthony Konieczny
1973 – Rev. John Gabalski
1972 – Rt. Rev. Msgr. Francis Wlodarczak

Science
2013 – None
2012 – None
2011 – None
2010 – Leonard Amborski
2006 – Arthur M. Michalek
1981 – Dr. Felix Milgrom
1980 – Dr. Francis Bajer 
1979 – Eugene Sulkowski, Ph. D
1978 – Dr. Michael S. Hudecki
1977 – Dr. Raymond Trudnowski
1976 – John Kopczynski
1975 – Dr. Peter S. Pawlik
1974 – Dr. Sigmund Zakrzewski

Sports
2013 – Stan Figiel
2012 – Don Pieczynski
2011 – Candis Kapuscinski
2010 – Rob Gronkowski
2009 – Dan Kryzanowicz
2008 – Jenn Stuczynski
2007 – Lee Stempniak
1981 – Ben Richards
1980 – Ray Wasielewski
1979 – John Sikorski
1978 – Frank Podsiadlo
1977 – Robert Pacholski
1976 – Henry Breski
1975 – Peter Machnica
1974 – Ron Joworski

Youth
2013 – None
2012 – None
2011 – Katherine Rivard
2010 – Gabrielle Pawlowski
2009 – Barry Pawlowski & Christina Slomczewski
2008 – Corrine Lasek
2007 – Peter Miecyjak
2006 – Alicia Krawiec
2005 – Kimberly Majewski
2004 – Veronica Couzo
2003 – Brooke Wiechec / Schwedner
2002 – None
2001 – Marguerite Rivard
2000 – Aniela Baj
1999 – Tersa Kaczynska
1998 – Conrad Malkowski
1997 – Agatha Glowacki
1996 – Craig Bucki
1995 – Thomas Wasiuta
1994 – Alexandra Krupski
1993 – Lisa Urbanski
1992 – David Smaczniak
1981 – Irene Woszczak
1980 – Wallace Piotrowski
1979 – Ann Dobrowolski
1978 – Joe Kroczynski
1977 – Denise Gryglewicz
1976 – Carl Bucki
1975 – Kasia Wrobel
1974 – Rev. Richard Zajac
1973 – Ray Marciniak

Notes

External links
 Official website

Polish awards
American people of Polish descent